Jess Bourke, better known as JessB, is a rapper and former professional netballer from Auckland, New Zealand. She has released two EPs (Bloom and New Views) and won Best New Zealand Act at the 2019 MTV Europe Music Awards.

Discography

Mixtapes

Extended plays

Singles

As lead artist

As featured artist

Awards and nominations

APRA Awards
The APRA Awards are presented annually from 1982 by the Australasian Performing Right Association (APRA), "honouring composers and songwriters". They commenced in 1982.

! 
|-
| 2021 
| "Meditjin" (Danzal Baker, Jess Bourke, Dion Brownfield, Jerome Farah, Dallas Woods)
| Song of the Year
| 
| 
|-

ARIA Music Awards
The ARIA Music Awards is an annual award ceremony event celebrating the Australian music industry. They commenced in 1987.

! 
|-
! scope="row" rowspan="2"| 2020
| rowspan="2"| "Meditjin" (with Baker Boy)
| ARIA Award for Best Hip Hop Release
| 
| rowspan="2"| 
|-
| ARIA Award for Best Video
| 
|}

References 

New Zealand rappers
Living people
Year of birth missing (living people)
Sony Music New Zealand artists